Ius or IUS may refer to:

 Ius, the Latin word for "law" or "right"
 Ius (canon law), a rule within the Roman Catholic Church
 Indiana University Southeast, a regional campus in the Indiana University system located in New Albany, Indiana
 Inertial Upper Stage, a two-stage solid-fueled booster rocket developed by the U.S. Air Force
 Innovation Union Scoreboard (formerly known as the European Innovation Scoreboard), an EU measure of and comparative assessment of the innovation performance of EU Member States
 Interactive Unix, a port of the UNIX System V operating system for Intel x86 processors
 International Union of Students, a worldwide association of university student organizations
 International University of Sarajevo, a private university located in Sarajevo, Bosnia and Herzegovina
 Inter-University Seminar on Armed Forces and Society, a professional organization for research on military institutions, civil-military relations, and military sociology
 Intrauterine system, a long-acting reversible hormonal contraceptive device

See also
Jus (disambiguation)